A Vaudeville of Devils: 7 Moral Tales is a collection of short stories and novellas by Robert Girardi.

"The Dinner Party"
The short story, loosely set in Portugal, is a synthesis between "The Masque of the Red Death", Our Man in Havana, and Shikasta. It was first published in TriQuarterly Review, Issue 99 (Spring/Summer 1997).

"The Defenestration of Abu Sid"
A crime, or detective novella about the Washington D.C. public defender Martin Wexler, and his personal growth defending a sociopathic gangster.

"Sunday Evenings at Contessa Pasquali's"
A mystery novella about the expatriate American Billy, who has settled in Naples and the Contessa's Sunday night soirees. "Vedi Napoli e poi muori."

References

1999 short story collections
American short story collections
Delacorte Press books